This article provides three lists:
A list of National Basketball Association players by total career regular season and playoff triple-doubles recorded.
A progressive list of regular season triple-double leaders showing how the record increased through the years.
A list of facts of triple-double achievements.

Triple-double leaders
The following is a list of National Basketball Association players by total career regular season and playoff triple-doubles recorded.

Statistics accurate as of March 16, 2023.

Regular-season leaders 

Source

Postseason leaders

Progressive list of triple-double leaders
This is a progressive list of triple-double leaders showing how the record increased through the years.
Statistics accurate as of March 19, 2023.

Facts

First triple-double in league history: Andy Phillip (Philadelphia Warriors) logged the league's first triple-double on December 14, 1950, versus the Fort Wayne Pistons. He had 17 points, ten rebounds, and ten assists.
Averaging a triple-double in a single season: Oscar Robertson and Russell Westbrook are the only players in NBA history to achieve this feat. During the 1961–62 season, Robertson averaged 30.8 points, 12.5 rebounds, and 11.4 assists per game. Although Robertson only achieved the feat for a full season once, his cumulative stats over his first 5 seasons gave him an average of 30.3 points, 10.4 rebounds, and 10.6 assists per game. Westbrook is the only player to achieve this feat multiple times, doing so in three consecutive seasons. Westbrook finished the 2016–17 season averaging 31.6 points, 10.7 rebounds, and 10.4 assists, and followed it up in 2017–18 with averages of 25.4 points, 10.1 rebounds, and 10.3 assists. In the 2018–19 season, Westbrook averaged 22.9 points, 11.1 rebounds and 10.7 assists per game. After not accomplishing the feat in the 2019–20 season, Westbrook, in his first season with the Washington Wizards, averaged 22.2 points, career-high 11.5 rebounds, and career-high 11.7 assists per game across 65 games in the 2020–21 season.
Most triple-doubles in a single season: In 2016–17, Russell Westbrook (Oklahoma City Thunder) recorded 42 triple-doubles.

Most triple-doubles in road games in a single season: Russell Westbrook (Oklahoma City Thunder) recorded 17 of 42 triple-doubles in away games.
Most 50-point triple-doubles in a single season: Russell Westbrook (Oklahoma City Thunder) recorded three 50-point triple-doubles in the 2016–17 season. James Harden (Houston Rockets) is the other player to record multiple 50-point triple-doubles in the same season, with two in the 2016–17 season and two in the 2018–19 season.
Most triple-doubles in a rookie season: Oscar Robertson (Cincinnati Royals) recorded 26 triple doubles in the 1960–61 season. Ben Simmons (Philadelphia 76ers) is in second with 12 in the 2017–18 season.
Most triple-doubles in the NBA playoffs: Magic Johnson recorded 30 playoff triple-doubles over his career; LeBron James is second with 28.
Most triple-doubles in NBA Finals: LeBron James recorded 10 Finals triple-doubles over his career. Magic Johnson is second with 8.
Averaging a triple-double in an NBA Finals: LeBron James (Cleveland Cavaliers), in the 2017 Finals, averaged 33.6 points, 12.0 rebounds, and 10.0 assists per game.
Youngest player: Josh Giddey (Oklahoma City Thunder), aged 19 years and 84 days, logged a triple-double on January 2, 2022, versus the Dallas Mavericks. He had 17 points, 13 rebounds, and 14 assists.
Oldest player: Karl Malone (Los Angeles Lakers), aged 40 years and 127 days—the only 40-year-old player to do so—logged a triple-double on November 28, 2003, versus the San Antonio Spurs. He had ten points, 11 rebounds, and ten assists.
Triple-double in final career game: The only players known to have done so are Dwyane Wade, who logged 25 points, 11 rebounds, and ten assists on April 10, 2019, for the Miami Heat against the Brooklyn Nets; Ben Uzoh, who logged 12 points, 11 rebounds, and 12 assists on April 26, 2012, for the Toronto Raptors against the New Jersey Nets; and Wilbur Holland, who logged 18 points, 11 rebounds, and 11 assists on April 8, 1979, for the Chicago Bulls against the Detroit Pistons.
Fastest triple-double: Nikola Jokić (Denver Nuggets), holds the record for the fastest triple-double. On February 15, 2018, Jokić recorded the mark 14 minutes and 33 seconds into the game against the Milwaukee Bucks. The previous fastest triple-double had held for almost 63 years, as on February 20, 1955 Jim Tucker (Syracuse Nationals), in his rookie year, recorded the mark in just 17 minutes, with 12 points, 10 rebounds and 12 assists in a 104–84 win over the New York Knicks.
Fewest minutes in 30-point triple-double: Luka Dončić (Dallas Mavericks) On November 20, 2019, Dončić recorded 35 points, ten rebounds, and 11 assists while playing just 25:30 in a 142–94 win against the Golden State Warriors. Dončić has two of the five fastest 30-point triple-doubles in NBA history and the only player to have more than one in 30 minutes or less.
Double-triple-double (at least 20 of any 3 statistics): Wilt Chamberlain (Philadelphia 76ers) and Russell Westbrook (Oklahoma City Thunder) are the only players to have accomplished this; in a February 2, 1968 game versus Detroit Pistons, Chamberlain tallied 22 points, 25 rebounds, and 21 assists. Westbrook recorded 20 points, 20 rebounds, and 21 assists against the Los Angeles Lakers on April 2, 2019.
Most points scored in a triple-double: James Harden (Houston Rockets) and Luka Dončić (Dallas Mavericks) hold the record for the most points scored in a triple-double with Harden scoring 60 points, 10 rebounds, and 11 assists on January 30, 2018, against the Orlando Magic and Dončić scoring 60 points, 21 rebounds, and 10 assists on December 27, 2022, against the New York Knicks. The previous record was 57 points by Russell Westbrook.
Most assists recorded in a triple-double: Isiah Thomas (Detroit Pistons), Rajon Rondo (Boston Celtics), and Russell Westbrook (Oklahoma City Thunder) are tied for the most assists recorded in a triple-double with 24. Isiah Thomas recorded 25 points, 10 rebounds, and 24 assists on February 7, 1985, against the Washington Bullets. Rajon Rondo recorded 10 points, 10 rebounds, and 24 assists on October 29, 2010, against the New York Knicks. Russell Westbrook achieved this feat twice: 24 points, 13 rebounds, and 24 assists on January 10, 2019, against the San Antonio Spurs and 14 points, 21 rebounds, and 24 assists on May 3, 2021, against the Indiana Pacers The latter was also the 3rd game in NBA history with 20+ rebounds and assists; the first two were the triple-20 games mentioned above.
Most rebounds recorded in a triple-double: Maurice Stokes (Rochester Royals) and Wilt Chamberlain (Philadelphia 76ers) are tied for the most rebounds recorded in a triple-double with 38. Maurice Stokes recorded 26 points, 38 rebounds, and 12 assists on January 14, 1956, against the Syracuse Nationals. Wilt Chamberlain achieved this feat twice, recording 24 points, 38 rebounds, and 13 assists on March 2, 1967, against the San Francisco Warriors, and 10 points, 38 rebounds, and 10 assists in a playoff game on April 16, 1967, against the San Francisco Warriors.
Most steals recorded in a triple-double: Larry Kenon (San Antonio Spurs) and Kendall Gill (New Jersey Nets) share the NBA record for steals in a game with 11, and both have registered a triple-double in doing so. Larry Kenon recorded 29 points, 15 rebounds, and 11 steals on December 26, 1976, against the Kansas City Kings, and Kendall Gill recorded 15 points, ten rebounds, and 11 steals on April 3, 1999, against the Miami Heat.
Most blocks recorded in a triple-double: Elmore Smith (Los Angeles Lakers) holds the NBA record for the most blocks in a game with 17, and it was made with a triple-double. He recorded 12 points, 16 rebounds, and 17 blocks on October 28, 1973, against the Portland Trail Blazers.
Triple-double not including points: The only occurrence of a triple-double without points was on February 10, 2017, when Draymond Green (Golden State Warriors) scored only 4 points, but collected 12 rebounds, 10 assists, and 10 steals against the Memphis Grizzlies. Green also recorded 5 blocked shots in the game.
Longest continuous streak of triple-doubles: Russell Westbrook (Oklahoma City Thunder) currently holds the record for the most consecutive triple-doubles with 11. His streak began on January 22, 2019, and ended February 14 of the same year. The previous record was nine by Wilt Chamberlain from March 8 to 20, 1968, when Chamberlain was a member of the Philadelphia 76ers.
Triple-doubles by teammates: This has occurred 15 times in NBA history. The following is a list of all NBA teammate triple-doubles, with playoff triple-double pairs highlighted in italics. Jimmy Butler and Bam Adebayo are the only pair of teammates to achieve this twice, while Stephen Curry and Draymond Green are the only pair of teammates to achieve this in the playoffs.

Triple-doubles by opponents: This has occurred at least 38 times in NBA history. Russell Westbrook has been involved in six of these:
Tom Gola and Richie Guerin (Philadelphia at New York, January 10, 1960)
Richie Guerin and Guy Rodgers (New York at Philadelphia, February 5, 1961)
Oscar Robertson and Richie Guerin (Cincinnati at New York, October 26, 1961)
Bob Pettit and Jerry West (St. Louis at Los Angeles, November 8, 1961)
Tom Gola and Jerry West (Philadelphia at Los Angeles, December 1, 1961)
Wilt Chamberlain and Dave DeBusschere (San Francisco at Detroit, March 5, 1963)
Bill Russell and Guy Rodgers (Boston at Chicago, January 17, 1967)
Oscar Robertson and Wilt Chamberlain (Cincinnati at Philadelphia, March 19, 1968)
Kareem Abdul-Jabbar and Walt Frazier (Milwaukee at New York, April 13, 1970)
Oscar Robertson and Sidney Wicks (Milwaukee at Portland, March 24, 1974)
Kareem Abdul-Jabbar and George McGinnis (Los Angeles at Denver, November 16, 1979)
Larry Bird and Micheal Ray Richardson (Boston at New York, March 24, 1981)
Magic Johnson and Mychal Thompson (Los Angeles at Portland, April 5, 1983)
Magic Johnson and Jeff Ruland (Los Angeles at Washington, February 10, 1984)
Jason Kidd and Clyde Drexler (Dallas at Houston, April 11, 1995)
Jason Kidd and Clyde Drexler (Phoenix at Houston, March 22, 1997)
Gary Payton and Chris Webber (Seattle at Sacramento, April 18, 2000)
Jason Kidd and Jay Williams (New Jersey at Chicago, November 9, 2002)
Tracy McGrady and Jason Kidd (Orlando at New Jersey, February 23, 2003)
Caron Butler and Baron Davis (Washington at Golden State, November 23, 2007)
Victor Oladipo and Michael Carter-Williams (Orlando at Philadelphia, December 3, 2013 )
Oladipo and Carter-Williams were both rookies when accomplishing the feat, marking the first and only time in NBA history that two rookies have recorded triple-doubles in the same game. These were the first career triple-doubles for both players. The last time that two players had recorded their first career triple-doubles in the same game was when Donnie Butcher and Ray Scott (Detroit Pistons) did it on March 14, 1964 (they were not rookies).
Russell Westbrook and Giannis Antetokounmpo (Oklahoma City at Milwaukee, March 6, 2016)
LeBron James and Stephen Curry (Cleveland at Golden State, June 4, 2017)
Nikola Jokić and Giannis Antetokounmpo (Denver at Milwaukee, February 15, 2018)
D'Angelo Russell and Kyle Lowry (Brooklyn at Toronto, March 23, 2018)
LeBron James and Ben Simmons (Cleveland at Philadelphia, April 6, 2018)
Ben Simmons and Giannis Antetokounmpo (Philadelphia at Milwaukee, October 24, 2018)
Ben Simmons and Russell Westbrook (Philadelphia at Oklahoma City, February 28, 2019)
Elfrid Payton and Luka Dončić (New Orleans at Dallas, March 18, 2019)
LeBron James and Luka Dončić (Los Angeles at Dallas, November 1, 2019)
Ben Simmons and James Harden (Philadelphia at Houston, January 3, 2020)
James Harden and Trae Young (Houston at Atlanta, January 8, 2020)
With Harden and Young scoring 41 and 42 points, respectively, this was the first time in NBA history opposing players recorded 40-point triple doubles.
Giannis Antetokounmpo and Russell Westbrook (Milwaukee at Washington, March 13, 2021)
James Harden and Domantas Sabonis (Brooklyn at Indiana, March 17, 2021)
Russell Westbrook and Domantas Sabonis (Washington at Indiana, May 8, 2021)
LaMelo Ball and Russell Westbrook (Charlotte at Los Angeles, November 8, 2021)
James Harden and Russell Westbrook (Brooklyn at Los Angeles, December 25, 2021)
James Harden and Dejounte Murray (Brooklyn at San Antonio, January 21, 2022)
Josh Giddey and Julius Randle (Oklahoma City at New York, February 14, 2022)

Notes

References

National Basketball Association lists
National Basketball Association statistical leaders